Misaki-Kōen Station could refer to:
 Misaki-Kōen Station (Hyōgo) - a station on the Kobe Municipal Subway Kaigan Line
 Misaki-kōen Station (Osaka) - a station on the Nankai Main Line and Nankai Tanagawa Line